Ntombizanele Situ (born 19 January 1971), better known as Zanele Situ, is a Paralympian athlete from South Africa competing mainly in category F54 throwing events. Specialising in the javelin throw, Situ is a two-time gold medalist at both the Paralympics and the IPC Athletics World Championships and is the first female South African black athlete to win a Paralympic gold medal.

Personal history
Situ was born in Kokstad, South Africa in 1971. At the age of twelve she experienced weakness in her legs which resulted in an inability to walk. Medical tests discovered a tuberculosis infection in her spine which resulted in Situ entering a two-year semi-coma, and was left with paralysis from the fourth vertebra down, leaving her requiring the use of a wheelchair. After becoming disabled she was schooled at Mthatha.

Athletics career
Situ first came to the international stage in 1998 when she represented South Africa at her first IPC Athletics World Championships, held in Birmingham, England. There she entered both the javelin and discus events, winning gold in the javelin with a best throw of 14.45 metres, and bronze in the discus throw. This led her to the 2000 Summer Paralympics in Sydney where she won a gold in the F52-54 javelin and a silver in the F51-54 discus. By taking gold in Sydney she became the first South African female black athlete to win a Paralympic title. Two years later she successfully defended her javelin world title in Lille, but despite adding almost two meters to her discus distance from Birmingham, it was only good enough for a fourth-place finish. 2003 saw Situ recognized for her achievements by her country when she was awarded the Order of Ikhamanga (silver) for her contributions to sport.

Two years later in Athens, Situ successfully defended her javelin title at the 2004 Summer Paralympics. Although not finishing on the podium in either the shot put or the discus, she was recognized by the International Paralympic Committee as the female athlete who best embodied the spirit of the Games when she was awarded the Whang Youn Dai Achievement Award.

After Athens, Situ entered a barren period competitively, failing to reach the podium at the 2008 Summer Paralympics in Beijing. She recovered some form in 2011, when she won bronze at Christchurch World Championships, but the emergence of world class competitors, such as Tunisia's Hania Aidi and China's Yang Liwan, made title challenges a difficult task. At the 2012 Summer Paralympics in London Situ threw a distance of 16.22 metres, but she fell short of the podium in fourth place.

In between the 2012 and 2016 Summer Paralympics, Situ claimed two more world bronze medals, at Lyon (2013) and Doha (2015), both in the javelin. At Rio, in the 2016 Paralympics, Situ achieved a personal best in the javelin, throwing a 17.90 metre mark in her third round to take her first Paralympic medal in twelve years, a bronze. At the Rio Games she was also recognized by her country, being given the honour of flag bearer during the opening ceremony.

References

External links
 
 

1971 births
South African female javelin throwers
South African female discus throwers
South African female shot putters
Paralympic athletes of South Africa
Athletes (track and field) at the 2000 Summer Paralympics
Athletes (track and field) at the 2004 Summer Paralympics
Athletes (track and field) at the 2008 Summer Paralympics
Athletes (track and field) at the 2012 Summer Paralympics
Athletes (track and field) at the 2016 Summer Paralympics
Paralympic gold medalists for South Africa
Paralympic silver medalists for South Africa
Paralympic bronze medalists for South Africa
Living people
Medalists at the 2000 Summer Paralympics
Medalists at the 2004 Summer Paralympics
Medalists at the 2016 Summer Paralympics
Recipients of the Order of Ikhamanga
Paralympic medalists in athletics (track and field)
People from Kokstad
Wheelchair javelin throwers
Wheelchair discus throwers
Wheelchair shot putters
Paralympic javelin throwers
Paralympic discus throwers
Paralympic shot putters